Vasum pugnus is an extinct species of medium to large sea snail, a marine gastropod mollusk in the family Turbinellidae.

Description
Measurements of the (incomplete) shell:  71.6 mm x 35.5 mm.

References

 E. H. Vokes. 1998. Neogene Paleontology in the Northern Dominican Republic 18. The Superfamily Volutacea (in part) (Mollusca: Gastropoda). Bulletins of American Paleontology 113(354):1-54

External links
  Vokes, Emily H. "The age of the Baitoa Formation, Dominican Republic, using Mollusca for correlation." Tulane Studies in Geology and Paleontology 15.4 (1979): 105-116.

pugnus
Gastropods described in 1917